Elm Street may refer to:

Elm Street station, railway station in Norristown, Pennsylvania
Elm Street (Yarmouth, Maine)
Elm St. (Ryan Cabrera album), 2001
Elm Street, a 2001 album by Lanterna

See also
 
 
 A Nightmare on Elm Street (disambiguation)
 Elm Street Historic District (disambiguation)